Shango is a Yoruba god.

Shango or Chango or Changó or Xangô may refer to:

 Shango or Trinidad Orisha, a syncretic religion of Trinidad and Tobago
 Shango (DC Comics), a fictional deity published by DC Comics
 The Shango spider, of the family Dictynidae
 Shangó (Santana album), 1982
 Shango (Juno Reactor album)
 Shango (Peter King album), 2009
 Shango (rock group), a 1960s rock group
 King Shango, an alternate name for reggae entertainer Capleton
 "Shango", a song on Angélique Kidjo's album Fifa
 King Changó, Latin ska band based in New York
 "Changó", a song by Devo on their album Hardcore Devo: Volume Two
 Charles Wright (wrestler) (born 1961), wrestled as Papa Shango
 Sangu language (Gabon), a language of Gabon (also known as Shango, Chango, Isangu, Yisangou, and Yisangu)

See also
 Shanga, an archaeological site in Kenya
 Chango (disambiguation)